Ahouabo is a village in south-eastern Ivory Coast. It is in the sub-prefecture of Adzopé, Adzopé Department, La Mé Region, Lagunes District.

Until 2012, Ahouabo was in the commune of Ahouabo-Bouapé. In March 2012, Ahouabo-Bouapé became one of 1126 communes nationwide that were abolished. Bouapé is a village just north of Ahouabo.

Notes

Populated places in Lagunes District
Populated places in La Mé